Heteronemiidae is a family of walkingsticks in the order Phasmatodea. There are about 14 genera and at least 80 described species in Heteronemiidae.

Genera
These 14 genera belong to the family Heteronemiidae:

References

Further reading

External links

 

Phasmatodea
Phasmatodea families